The 2004 San Francisco Giants season was the Giants' 122nd year in Major League Baseball, their 47th year in San Francisco since their move from New York following the 1957 season, and their fifth at SBC Park. The team finished in second place in the National League West with a 91–71 record, 2 games behind the Los Angeles Dodgers. Barry Bonds became the oldest player in the history of the National League to win the MVP Award. It would be the last winning season San Francisco would have until 2009. The Giants hit 314 doubles, the most in franchise history.

Offseason and spring training
On November 14, 2003, A. J. Pierzynski was traded by the Minnesota Twins with cash to the San Francisco Giants for Joe Nathan, Francisco Liriano, and Boof Bonser.

The Giants finished spring training with a record of 11–19, the worst in the Cactus League. This includes split-squad games but excludes any ties or games against non-Major League opponents.

Regular season

Season standings

National League West

Record vs. opponents

Notable transactions
July 30, 2004: Ricky Ledée was traded by the Philadelphia Phillies with Alfredo Simón (minors) to the San Francisco Giants for Felix Rodriguez.

Roster

Player stats

Batting
Note: Pos = Position; G = Games played; AB = At bats; H = Hits; Avg. = Batting average; HR = Home runs; RBI = Runs batted in

Other batters
Note: G = Games played; AB = At bats; H = Hits; Avg. = Batting average; HR = Home runs; RBI = Runs batted in

Starting pitchers 
Note: G = Games pitched; IP = Innings pitched; W = Wins; L = Losses; ERA = Earned run average; SO = Strikeouts

Other pitchers 
Note: G = Games pitched; IP = Innings pitched; W = Wins; L = Losses; ERA = Earned run average; SO = Strikeouts

Relief pitchers 
Note: G = Games pitched; W = Wins; L = Losses; SV = Saves; ERA = Earned run average; SO = Strikeouts

Awards and honors
 Barry Bonds, Seventh National League MVP Award (Bonds became the first player to win seven MVP awards)
 Barry Bonds, Major League record, Highest On-Base Percentage in one season, (.609) 
 J. T. Snow 1B, Willie Mac Award
All-Star Game
 Barry Bonds
 Jason Schmidt

Farm system

LEAGUE CHAMPIONS: AZL Giants

References

External links
 2004 San Francisco Giants at Baseball Reference
 2004 San Francisco Giants at Baseball Almanac

San Francisco Giants seasons
San Francisco Giants Season, 2004
San Francisco Giants Season, 2004
2004 in San Francisco
San Fran